Rakhil Solomonovna Eidelson (born 14 November 1958) is a Belarusian chess Woman Grandmaster.

She won the Belarusian Women's Chess Championship ten times (1980, 1985, 1987, 1989, 1993, 1995, 1997, 1998, 2003, and 2004). She played for Belarus in the Women's Chess Olympiad in 1994, 1998, 2000, and 2004.

References

External links
 
 

1958 births
Living people
Belarusian Jews
Belarusian female chess players
Soviet Jews
Soviet female chess players
Jewish chess players
Chess woman grandmasters
Sportspeople from Vitebsk